Clisospiroidea is an extinct taxonomic superfamily of fossil sea snails, marine gastropod molluscs.

Families:
 † Clisospiridae
 † Onychochilidae

References

Prehistoric gastropods